Carabus pedemontanus omensis is a subspecies of brown-coloured beetle from family Carabidae, that is endemic to Italy.

References

pedemontanus omensis
Beetles described in 1901
Endemic fauna of Italy